The Parc Merveilleux is an amusement park just east of Bettembourg in the south of Luxembourg. Designed above all for children, the park has a wide range of attractions including exotic birds, animals in their natural habitats, a pony ranch, a miniature railway, children's self-drive cars, adventure playgrounds, scenes from fairy tales, a restaurant and a cafeteria. The park is open every day from Easter to early October.

References

External links
 
Parc Merveilleux website

Animal theme parks
Amusement parks in Luxembourg
Zoos in Luxembourg
Bettembourg
Amusement parks opened in 1956
1956 establishments in Luxembourg